Marcus Otho (born Marcus Salvius Otho; 28 April 32 – 16 April 69) was the seventh Roman emperor, ruling for three months from 15 January to 16 April 69. He was the second emperor of the Year of the Four Emperors.

A member of a noble Etruscan family, Otho was initially a friend and courtier of the young emperor Nero until he was effectively banished to the governorship of the remote province of Lusitania in 58 following his wife Poppaea Sabina's affair with Nero. After a period of moderate rule in the province, he allied himself with Galba, the governor of neighbouring Hispania Tarraconensis, during the revolts of 68. He accompanied Galba on his march to Rome, but revolted and murdered Galba at the start of the next year.

Inheriting the problem of the rebellion of Vitellius, commander of the army in Germania Inferior, Otho led a sizeable force which met Vitellius' army at the Battle of Bedriacum. After initial fighting resulted in 40,000 casualties, and a retreat of his forces, Otho committed suicide rather than fight on, and Vitellius was proclaimed emperor.

Early life
Otho was born on 28 April AD 32. His grandfather Marcus had been a senator, and Claudius granted patrician status to Otho's father Lucius Salvius Otho. 

Suetonius, in The Lives of the Caesars, comments on Otho's appearance and personal hygiene.

Juvenal, in a passage in the Satire II ridiculing male homosexuality, specifically mentions Otho as being vain and effeminate, looking at himself in the mirror before going into battle, and "plaster[ing] his face with dough" in order to look good.

Greenhalgh writes that "he was addicted to luxury and pleasure to a degree remarkable even in a Roman". An aged freedwoman brought him into the company of the emperor Nero. Otho married the emperor's mistress Poppaea Sabina; Nero forced Otho to divorce Poppaea so that he himself could marry her. He exiled Otho to the province of Lusitania in 58 or 59 by appointing him to be its governor.

Otho proved to be capable as governor of Lusitania, yet he never forgave Nero for marrying Poppaea. He allied himself with Galba, governor of neighboring Hispania Tarraconensis, in the latter's rebellion against Nero in 68. Nero committed suicide later that year, and Galba was proclaimed emperor by the Senate. Otho accompanied the new emperor to Rome in October 68. Before they entered the city, Galba's army fought against a legion that Nero had organized.

Reign, decline and fall

Overthrow of Emperor Galba
On 1 January 69, the day Galba took the office of consul alongside Titus Vinius, the fourth and twenty-second legions of Upper Germany refused to swear loyalty to the emperor. They toppled the statues of Galba and demanded that a new emperor be chosen. On the following day, the soldiers of Lower Germany also refused to swear their loyalty and proclaimed the governor of the province, Aulus Vitellius, as emperor. Galba tried to ensure his authority as emperor was recognized by adopting the nobleman Lucius Calpurnius Piso Licinianus as his successor, an action that gained resentment from Otho. Galba was killed by the Praetorians on 15 January, followed shortly by Vinius and Piso. Their heads were placed on poles and Otho was proclaimed emperor.

He accepted, or appeared to accept, the cognomen of Nero conferred upon him by the shouts of the populace, whom his comparative youth and the effeminacy of his appearance reminded of their lost favourite. Nero's statues were again set up, his freedmen and household officers reinstalled (including the young castrated boy Sporus whom Nero had taken in marriage and Otho also would live intimately with), and the intended completion of the Golden House announced.

At the same time, the fears of the more sober and respectable citizens were relieved by Otho's liberal professions of his intention to govern equitably, and by his judicious clemency towards Aulus Marius Celsus, a consul-designate and devoted adherent of Galba. Otho soon realized that it was much easier to overthrow an emperor than rule as one: according to Suetonius Otho once remarked that "playing the Long Pipes is hardly my trade" (i.e., undertaking something beyond one's ability to do so).

War with Vitellius

Any further development of Otho's policy was checked once he had read through Galba's private correspondence and realized the extent of the revolution in Germany, where several legions had declared for Vitellius, the commander of the legions on the lower Rhine River, and were already advancing upon Italy. After a vain attempt to conciliate Vitellius by the offer of a share in the Empire, Otho, with unexpected vigor, prepared for war. From the much more remote provinces, which had quietly accepted his accession, little help was to be expected, but the legions of Dalmatia, Pannonia and Moesia were eager in his cause, the Praetorian cohorts were a formidable force and an efficient fleet gave him the mastery of the Italian seas.

The fleet was at once dispatched to secure Liguria, and on 14 March Otho, undismayed by omens and prophecies, started northwards at the head of his troops in the hopes of preventing the entry of Vitellius' troops into Italy. But for this he was too late, and all that could be done was to throw troops into Placentia and hold the line of the Po. Otho's advanced guard successfully defended Placentia against Aulus Caecina Alienus, and compelled that general to fall back on Cremona, but the arrival of Fabius Valens altered the aspect of affairs.

Vitellius' commanders now resolved to bring on a decisive battle, the Battle of Bedriacum, and their designs were assisted by the divided and irresolute counsels which prevailed in Otho's camp. The more experienced officers urged the importance of avoiding a battle until at least the legions from Dalmatia had arrived. However, the rashness of the emperor's brother Titianus and of Proculus, prefect of the Praetorian Guards, added to Otho's feverish impatience, overruled all opposition, and an immediate advance was decided upon.

Otho remained behind with a considerable reserve force at Brixellum on the southern bank of the Po. When this decision was taken, Otho's army had already crossed the Po and were encamped at Bedriacum (or Betriacum), a small village on the Via Postumia, on the route by which the legions from Dalmatia would naturally arrive.

Leaving a strong detachment to hold the camp at Bedriacum, the Othonian forces advanced along the Via Postumia in the direction of Cremona. At a short distance from Cremona they unexpectedly encountered the Vitellian troops. The Othonians, though at a disadvantage, fought desperately, but were eventually forced to fall back in disorder upon their camp at Bedriacum. There on the next day the victorious Vitellians followed them, but only to come to terms at once with their disheartened enemy, and to be welcomed into the camp as friends.

Death
Otho was still in command of a formidable force as the Dalmatian legions had reached Aquileia and the spirit of his soldiers and their officers was unbroken. He was resolved to accept the verdict of the battle that his own impatience had hastened. In a speech, he bade farewell to those about him, declaring: "It is far more just to perish one for all, than many for one", and then retiring to rest soundly for some hours. Early in the morning he stabbed himself in the heart with a dagger, which he had concealed under his pillow, and died as his attendants entered the tent.

Otho's ashes were placed within a modest monument. He had reigned three months. His funeral was celebrated at once as he had wished. A plain tomb was erected in his honour at Brixellum, with the inscription Diis Manibus Marci Othonis. His 91-day reign would be the shortest until that of Pertinax, whose reign lasted 87 days in 193 during the Year of the Five Emperors.

Reasons for suicide
It has been thought that Otho's suicide was committed in order to steer his country away from the path to civil war and to avoid casualties in his legions. Just as he had come to power, many Romans learned to respect Otho in his death. Few could believe that a renowned former companion of Nero had chosen such an honourable end. Tacitus wrote that some of the soldiers committed suicide beside his funeral pyre "because they loved their emperor and wished to share his glory".

Writing during the reign of the Emperor Domitian (AD 81–96), the Roman poet Martial expressed his admiration for Otho's choice to spare the empire from civil war through sacrificing himself:

Cultural references

In opera 

 Otho (or Ottone) is a character in L'incoronazione di Poppea (The Coronation of Poppaea), an Italian opera from 1643 by Claudio Monteverdi. Otho is in love with Poppaea but she spurns him. After learning Nero plans to leave her and marry Poppaea, Empress Ottavia orders Otho to kill Poppaea, which he attempts but finds he cannot carry out. He ends the opera in exile with Drusilla, a lady of the court who loves him. 
 Otho is a principal character also in Handel's opera Agrippina of 1709. Agrippina, Nero's mother, is intent on promoting her son's claim to the throne. Poppaea, the ingenue, is portrayed as the object of desire of Claudius, Nero, and Otho, whose rivalries Agrippina attempts to leverage to her advantage. Once Poppaea sees through Agrippina's deceit, she responds in kind, but only in order to be united with Otho, portrayed as her one true love.

In literature 

 Otho is a secondary character in the historical fiction novel Daughters of Rome by Kate Quinn. The book depicts the Year of the Four Emperors. Otho is portrayed as scheming but also charming. His suicide at the end of the portion of the book dedicated to his reign is depicted as a noble sacrifice.

In film 

 There have been multiple recorded versions of L'incoronazione di Poppea. The first was in 1979, a version with the Zurich Opera, and Otho was played by Paul Esswood. In the 2008 production Glyndebourne production, Otho is portrayed by Iestyn Davies. In the 2010 production at the Teatro Real in Madrid, released on DVD in 2012, Max Emanuel Cencic plays Otho. 
 In the 2013 Polish film Imperator, done entirely in Latin, Otho is a main character and is portrayed by Robert Wrzosek.

Notes

References

Sources

 
 
 Otho (69 A.D.) in De Imperatoribus Romanis.

External links

Primary sources
Life of Otho (Suetonius; English translation and Latin original)
Life of Otho (Plutarch; English translation)
Cassius Dio, Book 63
Tacitus, Histories (esp. 1.12, 1.21–90)

Secondary material
Biography on De Imperatoribus Romanis
Otho by Plutarch 
Juvenal; Satire II

 

 
1st-century Roman emperors
32 births
69 deaths
Ancient Romans who committed suicide
Imperial Roman consuls
Leaders who took power by coup
LGBT Roman emperors
People from the Province of Viterbo
People of the Year of the Four Emperors
Poppaea Sabina
Roman consuls who died in office
Roman governors of Lusitania
Roman pharaohs
Salvii
Suffect consuls of Imperial Rome
Suicides by sharp instrument in Italy